Jingtai may refer to:

Jingtai County (景泰县), Gansu, China
Jingtai Emperor (景泰, 1428 – 1457), Chinese emperor of the Ming dynasty
Jingtai Expressway (京台高速公路), projected expressway which will, when completed, connect Beijing with Taipei
Jingtai, Yitong County (景台镇), town in Yitong Manchu Autonomous County, Jilin, China